Gerard ( – 14 April 1070), also known as Gerard the Wonderful, was a Lotharingian nobleman. He was the count of Metz and Châtenois from 1047 to 1048, when his brother Duke Adalbert resigned them to him upon his becoming the Duke of Upper Lorraine.  On Adalbert's death the next year, Gérard became duke, a position that he held until his death. In contemporary documents, he is called Gérard of Alsace (after the fact that he had some land in Alsace), Gérard of Chatenoy (after an ancestral castle near Neufchâteau), or Gérard of Flanders (after his wife's homeland).

He was the second son of Gerhard IV of Metz, count of Metz, and Gisela who was possibly a daughter of Theodoric I, Duke of Upper Lorraine. Henry III, Holy Roman Emperor, invested Adalbert with Lorraine in 1047 after confiscating it from Godfrey III.  Godfrey did not back down, however, and killed Adalbert in battle.  Henry subsequently bestowed it on Gérard, but the deposed duke continued to stir.  Godfrey had the support of a faction of the nobles who did not want a strong hand at the ducal helm and Gérard was imprisoned. Gérard, however, had the support of the chiefest of his bishops, that of Toul, Bruno of Eguisheim-Dagsburg (later the sainted Pope Leo IX), who procured his liberation in 1049.  The emperor gave him troops to assist him in his fight, for the rebels had the support of some elements in the church. Gérard himself remained, as his brother had, faithful to the end to the imperial dynasty and his descendants would remain so as well even into the Hohenstaufen years.

His alliance with the church was regular but inconstant and he afforded his protection to Moyenmoutier Abbey, Saint-Mihiel Abbey, and Remiremont Abbey.  The former was the abbey of Cardinal Humbert of Silva Candida, who excommunicated the patriarch of Constantinople, Michael I Cerularius, in 1054, thus precipitating the Great Schism, and the latter was his own final resting place.

On 18 June 1053, Gérard and Prince Rudolf of Benevento led papal and Swabian troops into battle on behalf of Pope Leo. This was the Battle of Civitate and it was a disastrous loss for the pope. His enemy, the Normans, under Humphrey of Hauteville and Richard of Aversa, defeated his allies and captured his person, taking him prisoner in Benevento. Gerard, however, returned to Lorraine.

Among his other construction projects, was that of the castle of Prény, in the centre of the duchy, the beginnings of the capital city, Nancy. He died at Remiremont while trying to kill a revolt.  Poisoning was suspected.  The date of his death is either 14 April or 11 August.

He was married to Hedwige of Namur (or of Flanders), daughter of Albert II, Count of Namur, and Regelindis of Lower-Lorraine, daughter of Gothelo I, Duke of Lorraine. This marriage helped patch up relations with the baronage. They had the following issue:

Theodoric II, Duke of Lorraine (c.1055–1115), successor in Lorraine
Gerard (1057–1108), count of Vaudémont
Beatrice, married Stephen I, Count of Burgundy, Mâcon, and Vienne
Gisela, abbess of Remiremont

He was the patrilineal ancestor of the line of dukes which ruled Lorraine until 1737 and of the Habsburg-Lorraine dynasty that ruled Tuscany (1737–1859), the Holy Roman Empire (1745–1807), Austria-Hungary (1780–1918), the Duchy of Parma (1814–1847), Duchy of Modena (1815–1859), and Mexico (1864–1867).

Ancestry

See also
Dukes of Lorraine family tree

References 

1030s births
1070 deaths
Year of birth uncertain
Dukes of Upper Lorraine